Juan Carlos Mundin-Schaffter, known as Carlos Thompson, (7 June 1923 – 10 October 1990) was an Argentine actor.

Career
Of German and Swiss descent, he played leading roles on stage and in films in Argentina. He went to Hollywood in the 1950s and was typically cast as a European womanizer. His Hollywood films include Flame and the Flesh (1954) with Lana Turner and Pier Angeli, Valley of the Kings (1954), with Robert Taylor and Eleanor Parker, Magic Fire (1955) in which he played Franz Liszt, opposite Yvonne De Carlo, Rita Gam, and Valentina Cortese.

He moved to Europe and appeared in a large number of German films. He was chiefly known to English speakers for his appearance as Carlos Varela in the 1963 ITC Entertainment series The Sentimental Agent. In the late 1960s, Thompson left acting to become a writer and TV producer.

His first success on the European book market was The Assassination of Winston Churchill (1969), a refutation of allegations by David Irving (Accident. The Death of General Sikorski, 1967)
and the German playwright Rolf Hochhuth (Soldiers, premiered in the UK in 1968, London) that war time premier Winston Churchill had a part in the death of Polish General Władysław Sikorski, who perished in an air plane crash at Gibraltar on July 4, 1943, allegedly due to sabotage.

Personal life
Thompson married German-born actress Lilli Palmer shortly after her divorce from Rex Harrison in 1957. They remained married until her death in 1986.

Before his marriage to Palmer, Thompson had a relationship with Mexican actress María Félix. They met in Argentina in 1952 during the filming of Luis César Amadori's La pasión desnuda. The relationship was reportedly serious to the point that they became engaged to be married, and Félix even called for her son Enrique Álvarez Félix to meet his potential stepfather. However, during filming, Félix received a call from director Emilio Fernández to offer her the leading role in The Rapture, which Félix accepted, telling Thompson that after filming of La pasión desnuda ended she would return to Mexico to promote the film and announce their future marriage. However, once in Mexico, Felix canceled the wedding days before it would take place, stating that she concluded that the only thing that united her to Thompson was a mere physical attraction and not true love, before marrying The Rapture'''s leading man Jorge Negrete.

Death
Four years after his wife's death, Thompson committed suicide in Buenos Aires by a gunshot to his head.

Partial filmography

 ...Y mañana serán hombres (1939)
 Fragata Sarmiento (1941)
 Viaje sin regreso (1946)
 Los verdes paraísos (1947)
 Los pulpos (1948)
 La trampa (1949)
 El crimen de Oribe (1950) - Oribe
 Abuso de confianza (1950)
 Una viuda casi alegre (1950)
 The Unwanted (1951)
 Sala de guardia (1952)
 La de los ojos color del tiempo (1952)
 El túnel (1952) - Juan Pablo Castel
 La mujer de las camelias (1953) - Armand Duval
 La pasión desnuda (1953) - Pablo Valdes
 Fort Algiers (1953) - Jeff
 Flame and the Flesh (1954) - Nino
 Valley of the Kings (1954) - Philip Mercedes
 Magic Fire (1956) - Franz Liszt
 Thunderstorm (1956) - Diego Martinez
 Between Time and Eternity (1956) - Manuel
 Auf Wiedersehen, Franziska! (1957) - Stefan Roloff
 Das Wirtshaus im Spessart (1958) - Räuberhauptmann
 I Was All His (1958) - Nikolei Stein
 El último rebelde (1958) - Joaquin Murrieta
 Raw Wind in Eden (1958) - Wally Drucker
 Stefanie (1958) - Architekt Pablo Guala
 Die Halbzarte (1959) - Mr. Dott
  (1959) - Pedro Bastiano, Hauptmann
 Adorable Arabella (1959) - Robert Beaumaris
 Mistress of the World (1960) - Peter Lundström
 Der Held meiner Träume (1960) - Robert Moutier
 Stefanie in Rio (1960) - Pablo Guala
 Das große Wunschkonzert (1960) - René von Geldern
 The Last of Mrs. Cheyney (1961) - Artur Dilling
  (1962) - Christinow Tomkin
  (1962) - Bernard Somerset
 The Gypsy Baron (1962) - Sandor von Barinkay
 Ferien wie noch nie (1963)
 The Sentimental Agent (1963, TV Series UK.) - Carlos Varela
 La Vie de château (1966) - Klopstock (final film role)

References

External links

 Carlos Thompson in Cine nacional 

Argentine male film actors
Argentine people of Swiss-German descent
Argentine people of Swiss descent
Argentine people of German descent
Suicides by firearm in Argentina
Male actors from Buenos Aires
1923 births
1990 deaths
20th-century Argentine male actors
Burials at La Chacarita Cemetery
1990 suicides